Mogo is a fictional character who appears as a sentient planet and a member of the Green Lantern Corps in the DC Universe.

Publication history
Mogo first appeared in Green Lantern (vol. 2) #188 (May 1985) in a story titled "Mogo Doesn't Socialize" and was created by writer Alan Moore and artist Dave Gibbons. Although initially a one-off character from a short story, the planet has grown in importance in the Green Lantern mythos and is a necessary part of the process for distributing power rings as well as a destination for Corps members to recuperate.

Fictional character biography

Background
Mogo is a sentient and living planet. When it is desired, its affiliation with the Corps is shown with foliage arranged into a green band, marked with the standard Green Lantern Corps lantern symbol, circling Mogo's equatorial area.

In its early appearances, Mogo is not a social Green Lantern and its interactions with the rest of the DC universe are not well documented. It avoids announcing its presence, preferring to represent itself using pseudonymous holograms. In Mogo's first appearance, it is explained that the planet-sized Mogo's gravitational field would wreak havoc on any other planet it would try to "visit", hence Mogo "doesn't socialize".

Bolphunga the Unrelenting, an alien hunter, was one of Mogo's first direct adversaries; having tracked the legendary Green Lantern Mogo to the planet where he apparently 'resided', Bolphunga subsequently spent years searching the planet for Mogo, examining various plants and animals for any sign of a power ring, until closer examination of patterns in the foliage led him to realize just what Mogo really was, prompting him to flee Mogo in a panic.

In one incident, it sent holograms to purchase Lobo's dolphins. When Lobo tried to retrieve them, a Mogo hologram persuaded him not to. The dolphins turned out to have a symbiotic relationship with Mogo, eating space debris that fell to his surface. Lobo never discovered he was dealing with a sentient planet. At the same time, Mogo has allowed alien races to live on its surface and has been willing to change its climatic conditions to suit them. These inhabitants of Mogo may not always know that their home is alive and watching them.

When the Parallax entity, who was at that time inhabiting the body of Hal Jordan, destroyed the power battery on Oa and slew the Guardians, Mogo lost contact with the Green Lantern energy that helped sustain him. He traveled to Sector 1014 to seek the aid of Ch'p, unaware that his friend had died long ago. Having relied on the emerald energy of the power battery to sustain him, Mogo lost consciousness and drifted through Sector 1014 until he was discovered by a nomadic alien race. These aliens proceeded to strip Mogo of his natural resources and pollute his environment. Mogo's body reacted instinctively, creating constructs to hinder the aliens' efforts to exploit his resources. Mogo was finally rescued by Kyle Rayner, who used his power ring to reawaken the sleeping giant. Mogo offered to allow the aliens to settle on him and offered to take care of all their needs, but the stubborn beings chose to abandon their settlements. Mogo later revealed to Rayner that he was relieved the aliens had left, and that he had planned to give them terrible weather in retaliation for their pollution.

This storyline contradicts a Green Lantern annual where Kyle faces the bodies of many dead Green Lanterns, Mogo included, all of whom try to destroy him.

Mogo appeared in Green Lantern Corps: Recharge #2, requesting back-up against Rannian and Thanagarian forces. Green Lanterns Kyle Rayner, Guy Gardner, Stel, and Green Man were dispatched to clear out the enemy fleets and then enjoyed a respite on Mogo's surface (Guy made metafictional remarks about Mogo wanting to socialize, recalling the famous Alan Moore story).

With the restoration of the Green Lantern Corps, Mogo has taken on the role of a training and recreation planet for his fellow Green Lanterns. Soranik Natu, Kyle Rayner, and other Lanterns have traveled to his sector to ask for his counsel. Further, while defending Mogo from an attack by the Sinestro Corps, the Green Lantern Arisia explained that Mogo is responsible for guiding Lantern power rings without users to those who can overcome great fear, and says that "without him, the rings are directionless".

Infinite Crisis
Mogo played a major role in the conclusion of the Infinite Crisis, in which the Green Lantern Corps, Superman and Kal-L stop the villainous Superboy-Prime. The two Supermen flew the deluded Superboy-Prime through the red sun Rao in a desperate gamble to depower him. With their powers waning, the Kryptonians crash land on Mogo. Superboy-Prime is defeated by Superman, but Kal-L dies of his injuries. After the fight, the rest of the Green Lantern Corps, who have suffered fatalities themselves, take Superboy-Prime into custody.

In the 52 storyline, as Adam Strange and Starfire's ship is hurtling towards a sun, Mogo appears and rescues them.

Prophecy
In Tales of the Green Lantern Corps Annual #2 (1986), a prophecy narrated to Abin Sur suggests that Mogo will be the last Green Lantern. In a battle with the "Empire of Tears", Ranx the Sentient City will explode a blink-bomb within Mogo's core, killing the sentient planet and ending the Green Lantern Corps forever.

When the Corps is rebuilt again, many Lanterns gain partners. Mogo teams up with Bzzd, an insect-sized Lantern. Bzzd is killed battling Mongul II.

In Green Lantern Corps (vol. 2) #11 , Mogo apparently shows Kilowog images of his dead species, pushing him into madness and hatred toward the Green Lantern Corps. He then starts tampering with the minds of the Lanterns seeking advice and counseling in the form of illusions granted by Mogo's powers, framing Guy Gardner for killing and pitting the Lanterns against each other. This behavior seems to be caused by the virus Despotellis of the Sinestro Corps and, according to Guy Gardner, was actually unnoticed by the planet, who was immune to the fungus himself (stated by Green Man in issue #13). After the fungus made itself known by drilling towards Mogo's core, the sentient planet proceeded to shift its orbit into the path of an asteroid whose impact noticeably scars Mogo but eradicates the fungus, whose remnants are destroyed by the other Lanterns.

The Sinestro Corps attack Mogo with Ranx, who started to drill into the planet, with the intention of planting the blink bomb. It was revealed that Mogo is the one who guides the rings of deceased Lanterns to find new replacements and that if he should die, the Corps would be unable to recruit members in this manner. Thanks to Sodam Yat, as well as a change in the Book of Oa permitting the Lanterns to use lethal force against the Sinestro Corps, Ranx is destroyed and the Sinestro Corps are driven from Mogo.

Blackest Night
During the Blackest Night event, Oa is attacked by the deadly Black Lantern Corps. During the attack, Salaak decrees that all rings from fallen Green Lanterns should be sent to Mogo, so as not to endanger the lives of potential rookies. Soranik Natu then sends all injured patients from the fight to Mogo, but is sidetracked by Kyle Rayner being attacked by a Black Lantern Jade. She sends her partner Iolande to Mogo with the patients alone instead. Mogo shows up at Oa to help in the battle against the Black Lanterns with Kilowog stating "I guess Mogo does socialize after all", a tip of the hat to Moore's origin story. Mogo increases his gravity to such a degree that all of the Black Lanterns are pulled down to his surface and absorbed into his core. The superhot magma within continually burns up the Black Lantern's bodies, keeping them from regenerating their forms. Mogo describes this as "they will burn, for all eternity". The injured patients are shown to be resting safely on Mogo.

Following the successful imprisonment and destruction of the Black Lanterns, Mogo and the rest of the Green Lantern Corps along with Munk and Miri face the wrath of a red ring–possessed Guy Gardner. While Miri, a Star Sapphire, attempts to revert Guy to normal, it is ultimately Mogo who manages to purge the infection of the red light. However, he warns that some influence of the red still remains and that only a Blue Lantern's power ring could completely remove the influence of the red ring. Mogo soon resumes his duties of supervising new rookies as they are recruited.

War of the Green Lanterns
In the War of the Green Lanterns crossover, Mogo was corrupted and taken over when Krona attacked Oa with the emotional entities and Parallax climbed inside the Central Power Battery on Oa. Krona then used Mogo to send out hundreds of Green Lantern rings across the universe to recruit more members to be brainwashed. Kyle Rayner and John Stewart tried to stop Mogo while wielding blue and indigo rings respectively, but they could not reach him because of the Black Lantern energy that Mogo had absorbed from the events of "Blackest Night". John Stewart used his Indigo Tribe ring to absorb the Black Lantern energy, and was forced to destroy Mogo by firing a Black Lantern constructed bullet into his core. Mogo's sudden destruction caused fragments of his body to rain down upon Oa, destroying multiple structures and knocking out many rogue Lanterns under Krona's control, leaving an opening for Hal and Guy to get to Krona almost unimpeded. After Krona is apparently killed by Hal Jordan, Mogo's corpse is now orbiting around the planet Oa. After the ensuing chaos, along with Krona's death and Sinestro gaining a green ring, Kilowog states that as long as Mogo's corpse floats above Oa, the Corps will be disheartened. He gets numerous Lanterns together and they move his pieces into the nearest sun, giving him a "funeral pyre". The resulting reaction from Mogo's body being put into the sun causes a Mogo-like Green Lantern stripe to appear, forever honoring the planet.

The New 52
Following Mogo's destruction, the Guardians tell John Stewart that Mogo's remains appear to be moving toward a particular location, suggesting that Mogo is trying to reform. The Guardians assign Stewart to track it. While traveling, he encounters Fatality, who reveals that Mogo is actually a male and female consciousness that were 'mated' at the core, with John's fragment of Mogo containing the female consciousness that seeks to be reunited with its mate. This prompts Fatality to use her Star Sapphire powers to help the endangered love come together.

John and Fatality arrive at the location of Mogo's pieces. They are held prisoner by a space pirate using Mogo's power as the ship's energy beam weapon to attack the planet's core, threatening their lives. John and Fatality attack the space pirate, intending to free Mogo, by sending the space pirate to crash on the planet. John discovers the Guardians' plan to use Mogo. After the events of "War of the Green Lanterns", Mogo reforms into a planet's orbit. The Guardians reveal their plan was to use the size of the reconstituted Mogo and assimilate it into the Third Army, but the plan fails when Mogo destroys the Third Army trying to assimilate it.

The villainous First Lantern drained the Green Lantern Corps of their emotions on the planet Oa, but Mogo rescued the Corps by shielding them with dirt and stone, allowing them to escape from the First Lantern's powers. When the Green Lantern Corps are transported to Mogo, Mogo creates a scenario in which the Corps is attacked by their doppelgangers. Mogo freezes the doppelgangers and confesses the ruse to the Corps, stating that it was done to test their will and strength and prepare them to fight against the First Lantern. After the Lights Out crossover and the destruction by Relic, Mogo became the new headquarters of the Green Lantern Corps.

Mogo's ring is later stolen by the forces of New Genesis. This causes Mogo's rotation to slow and its systems to crumble. Several Green Lanterns perish in an attempt to rescue Mogo's ring. Following the final battle at New Genesis, Mogo is restored when his ring is returned.

Future
In the Legion of 3 Worlds, it is revealed that in the 31st century Mogo has been long dead and without him, there was no way to distribute the rings and thus no Green Lantern Corps.

DC Universe
Mogo appears in DC Rebirth and the post-Rebirth DC Universe. 

In Hal Jordan and the Green Lantern Corps #1, after the events where the Green Lantern Corps found themselves displaced in another universe, Mogo and the other surviving members of the corps find their way back home to their own universe. Thereafter, Mogo also serves as the current headquarters of the Green Lantern Corps. For a period, during the "Prism of Time" and "Fracture" story arcs of Hal Jordan and the Green Lantern Corps, Mogo also served as the joint headquarters of the Green Lantern Corps (under the leadership of John Stewart) and the Sinestro Corps (under the leadership of Soranik Natu).

During the time that Hank Henshaw was hacking into the Green Lantern main Power Battery, he corrupted Mogo's landscape causing uncontrolled weather and for numerous buildings to collapse. Following Henshaw's defeat, Ganthet reveals the Guardians are secretly rebuilding Oa and intend to return the Green Lanterns' main base of operations back there to allow for Mogo to fully recover from this experience.

Powers and abilities
In addition to the standard powers of a Green Lantern power ring, Mogo can also alter his weather and surface conditions such as plant growth and gravity, and travel through space at faster-than-light speeds. Mogo has a form of sensory or extrasensory awareness of what is happening around and on it. However, his wellbeing is largely sustained by the constant supply of energy from a Green Lantern power battery. Without it, he eventually loses his strength and even falls into a seemingly comatose state. Mogos also telepathically guided the Green Lantern power rings to their bearers.

Reception
Mogo and the concept of a living planet has been examined in relation to philosophy, including whether a planet can be considered a living being and possess a soul according to the philosophy of Aristotle.

Other versions

Green Lantern versus Aliens
In the Green Lantern versus Aliens limited series, Mogo was also the adopted home of a group of Aliens. It seems that years ago, Hal Jordan and a group of fellow Green Lanterns were charged with dealing with these Xenomorphs following the death of a Green Lantern, and Hal Jordan wanted to avoid killing them if possible, believing that they were just animals and thus were not evil. His solution was to deposit them on Mogo, where they would be a threat to no one and would be able to live. Years after that, however, Kyle Rayner and other Green Lanterns, including Salaak traveled to Mogo to rescue the crew of a crashed freighter. This was Rayner's first encounter with the sentient planet, although he didn't speak to Mogo directly. Most of the GL squad did not survive. Due to its non-canon nature (as evidenced by the dead GLs showing up alive later), in their next encounter, Rayner does not remember this event.

In other media

Television
 Mogo appears in the Batman: The Brave and the Bold episode "The Eyes of Despero!". This version displays increased control of his land mass.
 Mogo appears in Green Lantern: The Animated Series, voiced by Kevin Michael Richardson. This version is initially a stowaway planet who caused numerous ships from throughout the universe to crash onto himself to imprison the criminals on board and keep them from harming others. While investigating Mogo for fallen Green Lantern Shyir Rev's power ring, Hal Jordan realizes the ring chose Mogo and brings it to the latter's core. Following this, Mogo guides Saint Walker to the Blue Lantern Corps' battery and assists him and Kilowog in fighting the Red Lantern Corps.

Film
 Mogo appears in Green Lantern: Emerald Knights.
 Mogo appears in promotional material for Green Lantern, though he does not appear in the film itself.

Video games
Mogo appears in DC Universe Online via the "War of the Light" Pt. 1 DLC.

Miscellaneous
Mogo appears in the Injustice: Gods Among Us prequel comic. He travels to Earth with the Green Lantern Corps to combat Superman's Regime and the Sinestro Corps until Superman pushes him into Earth's sun.

References

External links
 The Unofficial Mogo Biography at The Book of OA, a Green Lantern Corps fansite.

Characters created by Alan Moore
Characters created by Dave Gibbons
Comics characters introduced in 1985
DC Comics aliens
DC Comics extraterrestrial superheroes
DC Comics dimensions
DC Comics planets
DC Comics superheroes
DC Comics telepaths
Fictional characters with gravity abilities
Fictional characters with weather abilities
Fictional living planets
Green Lantern Corps officers
Holography in fiction